Ariana Governorate is one of the twenty-four governorates (provinces) of Tunisia. It is in northern Tunisia, approximately triangular, having as one of its sides part of the Gulf of Tunis, it covers an area of 482 km² and has a population of 576,088 (2014 census). The capital is Ariana.

Geography 
The governorate borders the governorates of Tunis and Bizerte.

The average temperature is 18.7 °C, and annual rainfall is 450 millimeters.

Administrative divisions

Administratively, the governorate is divided into seven delegations (mutamadiyat), six municipalities, four rural councils, and 42 sectors (imadas). The delegations and their populations from the 2004 and 2014 censuses, are listed below:

The following six municipalities are located in Ariana Governorate:

References

 
Governorates of Tunisia